Peepers is a fictional character appearing in American comic books published by Marvel Comics. He first appeared in Captain America Annual #4 and was created by Jack Kirby.

Fictional character biography
Peter Quinn was born in Cedar City, Utah. He was recruited by Magneto as a mercenary and professional criminal to be part of his new Brotherhood of Evil Mutants. He takes the name Peeper and joins Slither, Shocker, Lifter and Burner. After the group fails their first mission, Magneto abandons them.

The group changed their name to Mutant Force and offered their services to the Mandrill and battled Defenders for him in his scheme to take over the U.S. Peeper became the field leader of the team, his powers allowing him to see his enemy's movements and plan for them. They battled Valkyrie, Wasp, Hellcat, Nighthawk, and Yellowjacket. Despite being successful at first in defeating the Defenders and capturing the female Defenders so that the Mandrill could enslave them, the group was defeated by the Defenders during their third encounter. Mutant Force was arrested, but they bargained with the U.S. government and became their agents in exchange for their presidential pardon. Their tenure as government agents was short. They battled the Hulk, and later testified before a secret tribunal against the Defenders. Peeper and Mutant Force were later employed by Professor Power's Secret Empire. Alongside Mutant Force and Mad Dog, he battled the Defenders once again.

The Red Skull became the group's new sponsor. Now calling themselves the Resistants, they posed as a group advocating mutant rights, but actually operated as a terrorist group. Slither left the group at this time. To avoid being associated with their old criminal group, many of the members changed their identities. It was later revealed that the Resistants were one of many groups that was unknowingly controlled by the newly resurrected villain, the Red Skull.  Peeper now called himself Occult and wore a helmet to hide his features. The group rescued the mutant Quill from the custody of the new Captain America, John Walker, and Battle Star. The group fought Captain America again and claimed that their actions were all to oppose the Mutant Registration Act. They were soon joined by various new members, including Mentallo who posed as Think Tank. This time they came into conflict with Freedom Force, a group who ironically enough, had been another incarnation of the Brotherhood of Evil Mutants, but had now become government agents.

The new Captain America, John Walker, lost control during a battle near Carson City, Nevada, and seemingly killed Occult along with several other members of the Resistants due to his recent violent streak as the result of the death of his parents at the hand of the Watchdogs, another group the Red Skull had formed to discredit the image of Captain America. During the fight, Quinn was seriously injured after hitting high tension power lines and was electrocuted and believed dead.

These injuries may have been the cause of his later mental problems: in his next appearance Quinn would never speak. Another mission as the Resistants was a failure as well, so the team changed its name back to Mutant Force, but by now Peeper was becoming afraid during combat. Mutant Force was defeated and Quinn, now calling himself Peepers, was imprisoned at The Cage. Wolverine and the Beast met him and befriended Peepers, who by now was a stuttering, nervous mutant who had become mentally unbalanced. Peepers repeatedly stabbed a prisoner who tried to kill Beast at this time. Shortly afterwards he was released and became a bartender at Satan's Circus, a bar for supervillains.

Post M-Day
During the battle with the House of M, the Scarlet Witch changed reality, genetically altering over ninety percent of the world's mutant population and only leaving a few hundred with their powers as a result. During the aftermath of M-Day Peepers is seen with Mammomax and Erg on the run from the Sapien League. He comments that the X-Men hate them but Mammomax replies that the X-Men are heroes and won't turn them away, all three are caught and almost burned alive at the Xavier Institute's doorstep if not for the timely arrival of Wolverine and Colossus. However he becomes lost in the confusion of the Sapien League's attack and the arrival of the Sentinels, but he meets up with Outlaw who is also on her way to the Xavier institute for the promised sanctuary. The two become caught up in the fight between the Sapien League, the O*N*E* soldiers, and the X-Men all before reaching the mansion. Peepers stays quiet and out of the way of most of the other members of the 198. He is one of the mutants that receives a "tracking" chip and then later has it removed by Mr. M and follows him when he leads his exodus from the institute.

Messiah Complex
During X-Men: Messiah Complex Peepers is seen driving down a road while on the phone with X-Factor Investigations, claiming that he believes he is being followed.  After hitting a deer, Peepers loses control of his car and finds himself lodged deep in the brush by the side of the road.  While emerging from the wreckage, he is attacked, killed, and eaten by Predator X. Siryn received the call and rushed to investigate, but arrives only to find what remains of his body.

As part of the All-New, All-Different Marvel branding, Peepers is shown alive and well in Murderworld from which he presumably escapes from with his fellow captives after Arcade is defeated by Gwenpool and Deadpool.

Powers and abilities
Peepers was a mutant with "telescopic eyesight" superior to that of any normal human; his telescopic vision enables him to clearly see objects which are miles beyond normal vision range or too small for ordinary vision, and he can even see through matter. He can also project beams of energy from his eyes.

Other versions

House of M

Peepers was seen as a member of Magneto's mutant army during his rise to power. Peepers was later seen assisting Zebediah Killgrave in showing Ronan around the Earth Army's complex.

References

External links
 Peepers at Marvel.com
 

Comics characters introduced in 1977
Characters created by Jack Kirby
Fictional activists
Fictional bartenders
Fictional characters from Utah
Fictional characters with superhuman senses
Marvel Comics mutants
Marvel Comics supervillains